Kathleen Mickells (born 1951) is an American oil refinery worker, coal miner and activist with the Socialist Workers Party (SWP).

Mickells was born in Omaha, Nebraska and worked at the Cumberland Mine in Greene County, Pennsylvania before being laid off in 1987. In 1986, she led a delegation of American women coal miners to tour coal fields in the United Kingdom. In that same year, Mickells attended the International Miners Organisation meeting also in the United Kingdom. In 1987, she was part of the SWP delegation which attended the 75th anniversary of the founding of the African National Congress, which was held in Arusha, Tanzania due to the apartheid policies in South Africa.

Campaigns
In 1983 Mickells ran for commissioner in Washington County, Pennsylvania, and received 7% of the vote. In 1985, she ran a write-in campaign for the United States Congress in West Virginia. In 1988, Mickells ran as the vice presidential candidate alongside James Warren on the SWP ticket. The Warren/Mickells pair received 15,602 votes nationally. In 1991, Mickells ran as the SWP candidate for Mayor of Philadelphia, saying she would bring a working-class worldview to city politics. She finished in sixth and last place of the declared candidates, with 1,811 votes.

References

1951 births
Living people
Socialist Workers Party (United States) vice presidential nominees
Politicians from Philadelphia
People from Washington County, Pennsylvania
Politicians from Omaha, Nebraska
Women in Pennsylvania politics
Women in West Virginia politics
Socialist Workers Party (United States) politicians from Pennsylvania
20th-century American women politicians
20th-century American politicians
1988 United States vice-presidential candidates
Socialist Workers Party (United States) politicians from Nebraska
21st-century American women